{{Infobox military person
|name= Rowley Lambert
|birth_date= 23 April 1828
|death_date= 
|birth_place= 
|death_place=London, United Kingdom
|image= 
|caption=
|allegiance= 
|branch= Royal Navy
|serviceyears=
|rank= Vice Admiral
|commands=HMS ScyllaHMS Liverpool]]Australia Station (1867–1870)
|battles= Crimean War
|awards= Companion of the Order of the Bath
|laterwork=
}}

Vice Admiral Rowley Lambert, CB (23 April 1828 – 22 July 1880) was a senior officer in the Royal Navy.

Naval career

Born the son of Admiral Sir George Lambert, Rowley was appointed a lieutenant in the Royal Navy in 1848. He served in the Black Sea during the Crimean war. Promoted to Captain in 1855, he was given command of HMS Scylla and then [[HMS Liverpool (1860)|HMS Liverpool. He was the Commander-in-Chief, Australia Station, between 28 May 1867 until 8 April 1870. He died in London on 22 July 1880.

References

Bastock, John (1988), Ships on the Australia Station, Child & Associates Publishing Pty Ltd; Frenchs Forest, Australia. 

1828 births
1880 deaths
Royal Navy vice admirals
Companions of the Order of the Bath
Royal Navy personnel of the Crimean War